Audubon Park Historic District may refer to:

Audubon Park Historic District, Kentucky, in Audubon Park, Kentucky, on the National Register of Historic Places
Audubon Park Historic District, Memphis, Tennessee, on the National Register of Historic Places
Audubon Park Historic District, New York City in Manhattan, New York City, a designated New York City Landmark